Ni Shiqun (born 26 February 1997, in Shanghai) is a Chinese chess player, who holds the FIDE title of Woman Grandmaster (WGM).

In July 2015, she finished 2nd–3rd at the FIDE Zonal 3.5 Championship, a qualifier for the  Women's World Chess Championship 2017.
In October 2015, Ni won the women's division of the inaugural Asian University Chess Championship, which took place in Beijing. In 2016, she also won the Women's World University Chess Championship in Abu Dhabi.

Ni beat Lilit Mkrtchian, Valentina Gunina and Natalia Pogonina to reach the quarter-finals of the Women's World Championship 2017, where she was beaten by Alexandra Kosteniuk.

References

External links 

Ni Shiqun chess games at 365Chess.com

1997 births
Living people
Chess woman grandmasters
Chess players from Shanghai